Uttar Pradesh is a state of India.  The region's folk heritage includes songs called rasiya (known especially in Braj), which celebrate the divine love of Radha and Shri Krishna.  These songs are played by large drums known as bumb, and are performed at many festivals.

During the eras of Guptas and Harsh Vardhans, Uttar Pradesh was a major center for musical innovation.

Folk dances or folk theatre forms include: 
 Ghazals
 Khayal
 Marsiya
 Naqal (mimicry)
 Nautanki
 Qawwali
 Ramlila
 Raslila
 Swang

 
Uttar Pradesh